The 2008–09 Minnesota Golden Gophers men's basketball team represented the University of Minnesota in the college basketball season of 2008–2009. The team's head coach was Tubby Smith. This was Smith's second year as Minnesota's head coach. The Golden Gophers played their home games at Williams Arena in Minneapolis, Minnesota.  The Big Ten Network included the team in a two-and-a-half-hour special that featured Midnight Madness events from several Big Ten campuses on October 17, 2008; the Minnesota event to kick off the season was called "Tubby's Tipoff". The Gophers started the season on a twelve-game winning streak for the first time since the 1948–49 season.  The team became ranked on December 22, the first time the team had been ranked since the 2002–03 season.

Recruit Royce White signed with the Minnesota Golden Gophers, but did not play due to shoplifting and trespassing charges. He transferred to Iowa State in July 2010.

Roster

Incoming signees

2008–09 Schedule and Results

|-
!colspan="8" style="text-align: center; background:#800000" | Exhibition

|-
! colspan="8" style="text-align: center; background:#800000"|Regular Season

|-
! colspan="9" style="text-align: center; background:#800000"|Big Ten Regular Season

|-
! colspan="9" style="text-align: center; background:#800000"|2009 Big Ten tournament

|-
! colspan="9" style="text-align: center; background:#800000"|2009 NCAA Men's Basketball tournament

Rankings

References

Minnesota Golden Gophers men's basketball seasons
Minnesota
Minnesota
2008 in sports in Minnesota
2009 in sports in Minnesota